Blucher Creek is a  stream that rises in the hills south of Sebastopol, California, United States, and empties into the Laguna de Santa Rosa.

Course
Blucher Creek originates on English Hill, and initially descends to the north. It soon curves eastward to parallel Blucher Valley Road. It crosses under Bloomfield Road, Canfield Road, Lone Pine Road, and Gravenstein Highway (State Route 116) to reach a confluence with the Laguna de Santa Rosa just west of Todd Road.

Watershed

See also
List of watercourses in the San Francisco Bay Area

References

External links
Laguna de Santa Rosa Foundation

Rivers of Sonoma County, California
Rivers of Northern California
Tributaries of the Russian River (California)